The Ordnance QF Hotchkiss 6 pounder gun Mk I and Mk II or QF 6 pounder 8 cwt were a family of long-lived light  naval guns introduced in 1885 to defend against new, small and fast vessels such as torpedo boats and later submarines.  There were many variants produced, often under license which ranged in length from 40 to 58 calibers, but 40 caliber was the most common version.

6-pounders were widely used by the navies of a number of nations and often used by both sides in a conflict.  Due to advances in torpedo delivery and performance, 6-pounder guns were rapidly made obsolete and were replaced with larger guns aboard most larger warships.  This led to their being used ashore during World War I as coastal defense guns, the first tank guns and as anti-aircraft guns, whether on improvised or specialized HA/LA mounts.  During World War II 6-pounder guns were put back in service to arm small warships and as coastal defense guns.  The last ships to carry 6-pounders were the Aegir-class offshore patrol vessels of the Icelandic Coast Guard which replaced them in 1990 with Bofors 40 mm autocannons.

Operational history

Argentine service
Argentina adopted the 40 caliber Hotchkiss 6-pounder in the 1890s, to arm its four Giuseppe Garibaldi-class armored cruisers, purchased from Italy.  The Argentinians were at that time engaged in a naval arms race with Chile.  The last ships from this class were retired from service on 2 August 1954.
Argentinian ships armed with 6-pounder guns include:

 ARA General Belgrano
 ARA Garibaldi
 ARA Pueyrredón
 ARA San Martin

Brazilian service
Brazil adopted the 40 caliber Hotchkiss 6-pounder in the 1890s, to arm its coastal defense ships, protected cruisers and torpedo-gunboats. The Brazilians also used the competing Nordenfelt 6 pounders in lesser numbers.  The last Brazilian ship retired was the coastal defense ship Marshal Floriano in 1936. The former Brazilian coastal defense ship Marshal Deodoro was sold to Mexico in 1924 and renamed Anáhuac, which was retired in 1938.  
 Marshal Deodoro-class coastal defense ships
 Brazilian cruiser Republica
 Brazilian cruiser Almirante Barroso
 Brazilian torpedo gunboat Tiradentes

Chilean service
Chile adopted the 40 caliber Hotchkiss 6-pounder in the 1890s, to arm a battleship, an armored cruiser, and several protected cruisers.  The last of these ships was retired in 1933.

 Chilean battleship Capitán Prat
 Chilean cruiser Esmeralda
 Chilean cruiser Presidente Errázuriz
 Chilean cruiser Ministro Zenteno
 Chilean cruiser O'Higgins
 Chilean cruiser Presidente Pinto

Chinese service
China adopted the Hotchkiss 6-pounder in the 1880s, to arm its protected cruisers.  During the First Sino-Japanese war, ships on both sides were armed with Hotchkiss 6-pounder guns.  Surviving 6-pounder guns were in Chinese service aboard gunboats and auxiliaries during the Second Sino-Japanese War and World War II.

 Zhiyuen-class cruisers
 Chinese cruiser Jingyuen

French service
Despite originating in France the 6-pounder was not widely used by the French.  Like the British, who paired their QF 3-pounder Hotchkiss guns with the larger 6-pounder, the French often paired their 3-pounders with the more powerful Canon de 65 mm Modèle 1891.  This gun is sometimes referred to as a 9-pounder in English publications.  During World War II a few Flower-class Corvettes (Aconit, Commandant Drogou, Commandant Détroyat, Commandant d`Estienne d`Orves, Mimosa, Renoncule, Roselys) of the Free French Navy were armed with two 6-pounder guns.

Irish service 
A 6-pounder gun was fitted to the single Vickers Mk. D tank used by the Irish Army between 1929 and 1940. When the tank was scrapped in 1940 the gun was removed and used as an anti-tank weapon.

Italian service
Italy adopted the 40 caliber Hotchkiss 6-pounder in 1886 to arm its armored cruisers, battleships, protected cruisers, torpedo boats and torpedo cruisers.  The Italians also adopted the competing 43 caliber Nordenfelt 6 pounder gun and by 1909 the Nordenfelt had replaced the Hotchkiss in service.  This was the opposite of the British who replaced their Nordenfelt guns with Hotchkiss guns.

 Etna-class cruisers
 Goito-class cruisers
 Regioni-class cruisers
 Vettor Pisani-class cruisers
 Italian battleship Emanuele Filiberto
 Italian cruiser Marco Polo
 Italian cruiser Piemonte
 Italian cruiser Calabria
 Italian cruiser Dogali
 Italian cruiser Giovanni Bausan
 Italian cruiser Marco Polo

Japanese service 
Japan adopted the 40 caliber Hotchkiss 6-pounder in the 1880s to arm its destroyers, protected cruisers and unprotected cruisers.  The Japanese versions of the 6-pounder were known as Yamanouchi guns and were largely identical to their British equivalents.  Ships on both sides of the First Sino-Japanese war and Russo-Japanese war were armed with Hotchkiss 6-pounder guns.  The 6-pounder was the standard secondary and tertiary armament on most Japanese destroyers built between 1890 and 1920, and was still in service as late as the Pacific War.

 Akatsuki-class destroyers
 Harusame-class destroyers
 Ikazuchi-class destroyers
 Matsushima-class cruisers
 Murakumo-class destroyers
 Naniwa-class cruisers
 Shirakumo-class destroyers
 Suma-class cruisers
 Japanese cruiser Izumi
 Japanese cruiser Unebi
 Japanese cruiser Takao

Russian service 
The Russians began purchasing 40 caliber 6-pounders from France starting in 1904 to replace its 3-pounder and 1-pounder guns in the anti-torpedo boat role.  In addition to 40 caliber guns, 50 and 58 caliber guns were also produced under license at the Obukhov State Plant.  These were installed on torpedo cruisers and submarines built from 1905 to 1917.  Beginning in 1909–1910 most larger surface ships began replacing their 6-pounders with 75mm 50 caliber Pattern 1892 and 102mm 60 caliber Pattern 1911 guns when combat experience in the Russo-Japanese war showed the 6-pounders were almost as ineffective as the 3-pounder and 1-pounder guns they had replaced.  In 1911–12 a number were turned over to the Army for use as coastal artillery, and later in 1914 some were converted into anti-aircraft guns.  In addition to the Hotchkiss guns there were also Nordenfeld Guns which were used as ranging guns for coastal defenses.  Finland, a successor state to the Russian Empire, inherited a number of 6-pounders and used them throughout the Winter War and World War II in the coastal artillery role.

 Bars-class submarines
 Morzh-class submarines
 Narval-class submarines
 Finn-class torpedo cruisers
 Okhotnik-class torpedo cruisers
 Ukrayna-class torpedo cruisers
 Vsadnik-class torpedo cruisers

Spanish service 
Spain adopted both the 40-caliber Hotchkiss 6-pounder and the 42-caliber Nordenfelt 6-pounder in the 1880s to arm its armored cruisers, battleships, protected cruisers and unarmored cruisers.  Seven ships (1 battleship, 3 unarmored cruisers and 3 protected cruisers) carried the Hotchkiss guns and eleven (8 unarmored cruisers and 3 protected cruisers) carried the Nordenfelt guns.  Ships on both sides of the Spanish–American War were armed with various 6-pounder guns (Driggs-Schroeder, Hotchkiss and Nordenfelt).  The Spanish cruiser Isla de Cuba, which was captured by the United States during the Spanish–American War and served as the USS Isla de Cuba until sold to Venezuela in 1912 and renamed Mariscal Sucre, was the last ship decommissioned and scrapped in 1940.

 Torpedo gunboat Destructor
 Alfonso XII-class cruisers
 Isla de Luzón-class cruisers
 Spanish battleship Pelayo

United Kingdom service 
The UK adopted a 40 calibre (i.e. 90 inch barrel) version as Ordnance QF Hotchkiss 6 pounder gunMk I and Mk II or QF 6 pounder 8 cwt. It was manufactured under licence by the Elswick Ordnance Company.  They were originally mounted from 1885 onwards for use against the new (steam-driven) torpedo boats which started to enter service in the late 1870s.

The UK also adopted the competing 42 calibre Ordnance QF 6 pounder Nordenfelt at the same time as the QF 6-pounder Hotchkiss, but the Royal Navy was not satisfied with the special Nordenfelt ammunition and fuzes. Following the explosion in 1900 of an ammunition ship due to defective fuses, Britain replaced Nordenfelt fuzes with the Hotchkiss designs and Nordenfelt guns were phased out in favor of the Hotchkiss guns and were declared obsolete by 1919.

The original 1885 Hotchkiss Mk I was a built-up gun with a barrel, jacket and a locking hoop screwed to the front of the jacket.  The Mk I lacked a recoil system, but the Mk II of 1890 introduced a hydraulic recoil mechanism with a pair of hydro-spring cylinders.  During World War I the navy required many more guns and an autofretted, mono-block barrel version was developed to simplify manufacture and identified as "6 pdr Single Tube". Initially these guns were only allowed to be fired with a special lower charge, but in 1917 they were relined with A tubes as Mk I+++ which enabled them to use the standard 6-pounder ammunition.

After World War I the gun was considered obsolete for combat use, but continued in use as a saluting gun and as sub-calibre training guns.  Of the 3,984 produced it was estimated that 1,640 still existed in 1939.  With the onset of World War II the remaining guns were rushed back into service for anti-submarine defence, E-boat defence and for coastal defence.  New non-recoil Mk VI, Mk VI* and Mk VI** mountings were built with elevations between -10° to +70°.  These mountings were used on early models of the Fairmile D Motor Gunboats, Motor Launches and Flower-class corvettes.  Some of which were not re-armed with the modern  6-pdr Mk IIA with auto-loader until late 1944.

Royal Navy ships armed with QF 6-pounder Hotchkiss guns include:

 A-class destroyers
 Admiral-class ironclads
 Adventure-class cruisers
 Apollo-class cruisers
 B-class destroyers
 Banff-class sloops
 British H-class submarines
 C and D-class destroyers
 C-class cruisers
 C-class destroyers
 Castle-class trawlers
 CD-class naval drifters
 Centurion-class battleships
 Conqueror-class monitors
 D-class destroyers
 Daring-class destroyers
 Devastation-class ironclads
 Dryad-class torpedo gunboats
 E and F-class destroyers
 Fly-class gunboats
 G and H-class destroyers
 Indefatigable-class battlecruisers
 Lion-class battlecruisers
 M15-class monitors
 M29-class monitors
 Marathon-class cruisers
 Orlando-class cruisers
 River-class destroyers
 Royal Sovereign-class battleships
 Stour-class destroyers
 Trafalgar-class ironclads
 Surprise-class cruisers
 Victoria-class battleships
 Warrior-class cruisers

Tank service 
The 6-pounder was used to equip Male versions of the early British Mk I - Mk III tanks.  In 1916 the British Army was faced with the difficulty of quickly providing a new class of weapon. The existing Hotchkiss 6-pounder naval gun appeared to most closely meet the need (a compact enough weapon to fit into a tank sponson with a sufficient high explosive shell). A single gun was mounted in each sponson, i.e. two per Male tank able to fire forwards or to the side.  Tanks armed only with machine guns were designated as 'Female'.

The gun turned out to be too long for practical use as the end of the barrel could come into contact with the ground or other obstacles as the tank traveled over uneven ground. The British chose to shorten the gun rather than change its location and replaced it in 1917 in the Mark IV tank onwards by the shorter QF 6 pounder 6 cwt Hotchkiss.

Anti-aircraft service
Britain lacked any dedicated air-defence artillery early in World War I and up to 72 6-pounders were adapted to high-angle pedestal mountings at key establishments in Britain for close air defence by 1916. They are not listed as still being in service in this role at the end of the war, presumably because German bombing attacks were conducted from relatively high altitudes which would have been beyond the gun's range.

United States service 

The history of the Hotchkiss 6-pounder (called the Rapid Fire gun rather than Quick Firer in the US) in United States Navy and Army service is a complex story.  It was used in conjunction with another maker's design, its primary rival being the Driggs-Schroeder  6-pounder.  Oddly, one shipbuilding and naval supply company, Cramp & Sons, had a license to build both the Hotchkiss and Driggs-Schroeder and sold both to the Navy in parallel.  It appears that Hotchkiss type guns had an edge in production in the first half of the 1890s, but by 1895 Driggs-Schroeders were being produced in quantity to equip a considerable number of newly commissioned ships.  The initial purchases by the Navy were in small lots each year and there was no mass-production of these guns like one would see in smaller weapons.  The Navy made certain that the ammunition for both the Hotchkiss and Driggs-Schroeder guns were identical.

There is no question that the Driggs-Schroeders were predominant in the new protected and armored cruisers that were being commissioned by 1895. However, USS Texas, a second class battleship commissioned in 1895, carried a mixed  6-pounder complement of ten Driggs-Schroeders and two Hotchkiss guns. USS Maine, an armored cruiser, exclusively carried Driggs-Schroeder  6-pounders although it had a mixed one pounder battery of both Driggs-Schroeder and Hotchkiss. Ships known to have carried exclusively Driggs-Schroeder  6-pounders are USS Olympia, Brooklyn, New York, and Columbia. Unlike her 8-inch guns, the preserved  retains her Driggs-Schroeder 6-pounders. She is at the Independence Seaport Museum in Philadelphia.

Beginning in 1910 6-pounder guns were replaced by 3"/50 caliber guns aboard US Navy ships.  However smaller ships such as US Coast Guard cutters, gunboats and minesweepers continued to use 6-pounders in the years between World War I and World War II.

 Amphitrite-class monitors
 Arkansas-class monitors
 Bainbridge-class destroyers
 Cincinnati-class cruisers
 Columbia-class cruisers
 Denver-class cruisers
 Dubuque-class gunboats
 Florida-class battleships
 Hawk-class minesweepers
 Illinois-class battleships
 Indiana-class battleships
 Kearsarge-class battleships
 Montgomery-class cruisers
 New Orleans-class cruisers
 Tampa-class cutters
 Treasury-class cutters
 Truxtun-class destroyers
 Yorktown-class gunboats
 
 
 USS Atlanta
 
 USS Boston
 
 USS Chicago
 
 
 
 
 
 
 
 
 
 
 
 
 
 
 USS Paragua

US Army service 
The US Army also used the Hotchkiss 6-pounder, referred to as a "2.24-inch gun" in some period references. As the primary defender of coastal fortifications and harbors, the US Army had a need for lighter guns to supplement their shore batteries, particularly since land defense against infantry was a consideration in the 1890s. The Army was in an experimental phase like the Navy, testing new weapons in an era when military budgets were expanding after decades of Congressional stinginess.

It appears that the US Army and US Navy, while both using the "Mark" system, assigned their designations to different ordnance.  References indicate that Driggs-Schroeder guns, manufactured by the American Ordnance Company and designated Mark II and Mark III, were adopted along with Driggs-Seabury weapons designated M1898 and M1900.  In 1898–1901 a total of 97 weapons were acquired: 20 M1898, 40 M1900, 10 Mark II, and 27 Mark III guns. However, 17 M1898 and all ten Mark II guns were transferred for use on Army troop transports in the Spanish–American War of 1898, leaving 70 weapons for land use.  The mountings for the Army six pounders were called M1898 and M1898 (modified) "rampart mounts" or "parapet mounts", wheeled carriages with fittings that allowed them to be secured to pintle mounts. Another reference has somewhat different figures.  There were generally two of these guns issued per major fort, and eventually many of them became saluting guns at the post's flagpole. A dozen were deployed at Fort Ruger in Hawaii as part of the Land Defense Project of 1915–1919, while others were deployed in the Philippines under this project.

Ammunition
The 6-pounder fired Fixed QF 57x307R ammunition. The most common types of ammunition available for 6-pounder guns were shrapnel, steel and common shells. In World War II higher-yield high explosive rounds were produced.

Photo gallery

Licensed production 

 Elswick Ordnance Company
 Obukhov State Plant
 William Cramp & Sons

Wars

 First Sino-Japanese War
 Spanish–American War
 Russo-Japanese War
 Italo-Turkish War
 First Balkan War
 Second Balkan War
 World War I
 Russian Civil War
 Second Sino-Japanese War
 Winter War
 World War II
 Cod Wars

Users

Surviving examples
 Twin 6 pounder QF Guns Mk I on Pedestal Mount Mk I, Belmont Battery, Fort Rodd Hill, Victoria, British Columbia
 One 6 pounder QF Gun Mk I (#502 Hotchkiss) on Garrison Carriage Mk I** (Hotchkiss Cone Mount), Fort Rodd Hill, Victoria, British Columbia
 One 6 pounder QF Gun Mk I (tube only), Fort Rodd Hill, Victoria, British Columbia
 One 6 pounder QF Gun Mk I (13980 & N1584) on Pedestal Mount Mk I (5110), Bay Street Armoury, Victoria, British Columbia
 One 6 pounder QF Gun Mk III on wheeled carriage, private tank museum, Mattituck, New York
 One 6 pounder QF Gun Mk III on wheeled carriage, Virginia War Museum, Newport News, Virginia
 One 6 pounder QF Gun on wheeled carriage, Veterans' Memorial Park, Plymouth, Michigan
 One 6 pounder QF Gun M1900 on wheeled carriage, Maquoketa, Iowa
 Three 6 pounder QF Gun 1892 on recoil mounts, Yacht Club Argentino, Buenos Aires

See also
5.2 cm SK L/55 naval gun : German equivalent
QF 6 pounder Nordenfelt : Maxim-Nordenfelt equivalent
Canon de 65 mm Modèle 1891 : French equivalent

Notes

Bibliography
 Text Book of Gunnery, 1902. LONDON : PRINTED FOR HIS MAJESTY'S STATIONERY OFFICE, BY HARRISON AND SONS, ST. MARTIN'S LANE 
 
 I.V. Hogg and L.F. Thurston, British Artillery Weapons & Ammunition 1914–1918. London: Ian Allan, 1972. 
 LC Reynolds, Motor Gunboat 658. Cassell Military Paperbacks, London, 2002. 
 Brigadier N.W. Routledge, History of the Royal Regiment of Artillery. Anti-Aircraft Artillery 1914–55. London: Brassey's, 1994

External links

 DiGiulian, Tony, British 6-pdr / 8cwt (2.244"/40 (57 mm)) QF Marks I and II
 DiGiulian, Tony, US 6-pdr (2.72 kg) (2.244" (57 mm)) Marks 1 through 13
 DiGiulian, Tony, Russian 57 mm/40, 57 mm/50 and 57 mm/58 (2.244")
 Handbook of the 6 pounder Hotchkiss quick-firing gun Land service 1892 at State Library of Victoria
 Handbook for Hotchkiss 6-pr and 3-pr. quick-firing guns 1896 at State Library of Victoria

Tank guns
Coastal artillery
57 mm artillery
Naval guns of China
Naval guns of Japan
Russo-Japanese war weapons of Japan
Russo-Japanese war weapons of Russia
Naval guns of the United Kingdom
World War I naval weapons of the United Kingdom
World War I artillery of the United Kingdom
Naval guns of the United States
Artillery of the United States